Herzen University, or formally the Russian State Pedagogical University in the name of A. I. Herzen is a university in Saint Petersburg, Russia. It was formerly known as the Leningrad State Pedagogical Institute.  It is one of the largest universities in Russia, operating 20 faculties and more than 100 departments. Embroidered in its structure are the Institute of Pre-University Courses, the Institute of Continuous Professional Development, and the Pedagogical Research Center.

The university is named after the Russian writer and philosopher Alexander Herzen.

History
The Imperial Foundling House eventually developed into the modern Pedagogical University.

Betskoy's humanistic ideas furnished the basic principles of the foundling house. The pedagogical traditions and consistency in education were passed from one generation to the next and were finally inherited by The State Russian Herzen Pedagogical University. The foundling house was based in an architectural complex: the palaces of the earl Kirill Razumovsky and Aleksey Grigorievich Bobrinsky on the Moyka in present-day Saint Petersburg.

The Imperial Foundling House developed as an educational establishment carrying progressive ideas of upbringing based upon charity and patronage. It mainly took in destitute and deprived children: foundling orphans, disabled children, and children from failed marriages. Besides being an educational establishment and a center for childcare, the foundling house had an operating hospital. Surrounding village districts had for the first time access to free pediatric care. 

In 1837, the "Women's Foundling Institute" was established on the basis of the House's higher classes. After 1885 it was called Nicholas' Foundling House. Its graduates were taught by a tutor, a music and dancing pedagogue and a French language teacher. The experience of the Nicholas' Foundling house gave rise to the establishment of the first institution for pedagogical higher education: the  that was established in 1903.

In 1806, a college for the deaf appeared, the first educational establishment for disabled children in Russia. Here, the first Russian pedagogues for deaf children were educated and their first works on the subject were created.

In 1864, a pedagogical seminary was created for countryside students who were to become teachers of public schools and colleges. Four years later, a women's college was established that granted specialisations of a fully trained nurse, village school and kindergarten children. This set the basis for Russian pre-school education. During these years, kindergartens were set up in the district of the foundling house. The graduates of the House worked in the new establishments for children. Konstantin Ushinsky's pedagogical ideas rendered influence on restructuring the departments of the foundling house. A system of establishments dealing with a range of questions concerning birth, pre-school, elementary, high-school, higher education, and correctional pedagogics was set, giving rise to a prototype of the prospective university.

In 1918, the consolidation process of Mariinsky department and foundling house-related establishments started. In the same year, the Women's Pedagogical University was renamed the First Pedagogical Institute. Based on the Teachers' Board, the second Pedagogical Institute was established. On 17 October 1918, the third Pedagogical Institute was created. In 1918, the foundling house-related establishments were reorganized into the Pre-school Education Institute and Social Education Institute. These were the first higher education facilities in Russia that specialized in pre-school and primary school education and defectology. In the period between 1922 and 1925, the first, second, and third Pedagogical Universities, the Pre-school education Institute, the Social Education Institute, and the Psychoneurological Institute were merged. The united establishment was named State Leningrad Herzen Pedagogical Institute.

After the 2022 Russian invasion of Ukraine, the university in Krakow in Poland, the University of Freiburg in Germany, and the international university consortium ‘University of the Arctic’ suspended  cooperation with the university.

Notable staff and alumni
Over the years, the university has been the workspace for outstanding scientists, academicians, and professors. Many of them initiated worldwide known scientific schools, thus making a valuable input in development of Russian science.

 , psychologist
 Aleksandra Antonova (1932–2014), teacher and writer
 Alexander Kushner, poet (graduated from the university)
 Raissa L. Berg, geneticist
 , physiologist
 Nina Dyakonova, English literature historian
 Efim Etkind, Russian and Western literature historian
 Alexander Fersman, geologist
 Grigorii Fichtenholz, mathematician
 , geologist
 Boris Grekov, historian
 Igor Ivanov, pedagogue
 Orest Khvolson, physicist
 Nikolai Knipovich, zoologist
 Vladimir Komarov, botanist (who later became President of Russian Academy of Sciences)
 Igor Kon, sociologist and sexologist
 Igor Kurchatov, physicist
 Solomon Mikhlin, mathematician
 Leon Orbeli, physiologist
 Alexey Parygin, artist, and art theorist
 Boris Parygin, social psychologist
 , pedagogue
 Sergei Rubinstein, psychologist
 , geographer
 Yuly Shokalsky, geographer
 , botanist
 , geographer
 , pedagogue
 Vasily Struve, historian
 Aleksandr Volodin, linguist
 Oktyabrina Voronova (1934–1990), poet 
 Lev Vygotsky, psychologist
 Yevgeny Tarle, historian
 Thongloun Sisoulith, President of Laos

See also
List of higher education and academic institutions in Saint Petersburg

References

External links
 Official site 

Herzen University
Universities in Saint Petersburg
1797 establishments in the Russian Empire
Educational institutions established in 1797
Teachers colleges in Russia
Public universities and colleges in Russia
Cultural heritage monuments of federal significance in Saint Petersburg